Motivational deficiency disorder is the name of a fake disease imagined for a health campaign to raise awareness of disease mongering.

Campaign

The disease was first described in an effort coordinated by Ray Moynihan when BMJ published a description of it for April Fool's Day in 2006.

Fake neurologist "Leth Argos" is said to have described the disorder, finding that "extreme laziness may have a medical basis" and that "motivational deficiency disorder can be fatal, because the condition reduces the motivation to breathe." Despite the condition being poorly understood, it is also "underdiagnosed and undertreated." A person living with the condition complained that he would spend all day at the beach.

In the original campaign medical marketers recommended treating the disease with a drug called "Indolebant". They presented a case study in which a lazy man who took the drug then got off his sofa to begin a job as an investment adviser. The original campaign also contained an advertisement for an issue of PLOS on disease mongering.

In 2008 Consumers International revived the campaign to draw further attention to the issue of disease mongering.

Although a spoof, some news outlets have reported the disease as if this were a real disorder. The disease was invented and presented to the public as a demonstration that some media outlets are willing to publish sensational health stories and that people respond with worry when they do.

References

External links
4-minute report about motivational deficiency disorder
1-minute video advertising a drug to treat motivational deficiency disorder
issue of PLOS advertised in original article
transcript of radio report on the condition

April Fools' Day
Health campaigns
Unnecessary health care
Motivation
2006 in mass media